Ashide (Middle Chinese: *ʔɑ-ʃɨXtək̚; Old Tibetan: A sha sde’) is one of the dominant clans of Turkic Khaganate. This clan is also the conjugal clan of the Göktürk khagans' Ashina clan.

The origin
According to Zheng Qiao's 1161 Comprehensive Records (vol. 29), Ashide descended from an ancient Shǐshàn kèhán 始善可汗 (lit. "First Good Khagan"), whose identity remains unknown.

Yury Zuev reconstructed Old Turkic *Ashtak, further from Middle Persian Azdahāg, from Avestan: Aži Dahāka "Serpent, Dragon" Earlier, H. W. Bailey noticed similarity with Iranian *xšaita ‘ruler’, cf. Sogd. xšēδ, axšēδ ‘ruler’.

The Ashide's status as the Ashina's conjugal clan is reflected by Youyang Zazu, which relates a myth that the Ashina's ancestor Shemo fell in love with the sea-goddess west of the Ashide cave.

Notable Ashide representatives
The baga-tarkhan (military leader) of four Göktürk khagans Tonyukuk and the mother of Chinese warlord An Lushan were both of Ashide origin.

Tamga Ashide

Ashide and Ashina
Historian S.G.Klyashtorny said that originally Ashina and Ashide together were dual system, so well known among the Turkic and Mongolian peoples.

Chiefs Ashide bore the title Irkin (Pinyin: Sijin; Hanzi: 俟斤) common to tribal leaders in the Turkic Khaganate. However, their particular position is determined by kinship with the dynasty; no coincidence that one of Irkin Ashide tegin held the title - 'the prince of the royal family, prince'. Ashide clan did not have a single source, so in the Tang Shu mentioned Da Ashide and Bayan Ashide; their tamgas differ from tamgas of Ashide.

To the end of the 7th-8th centuries, probably be more correct to speak about Ashide as one of the tribes of the khaganate, which together with Ashina was the main military and political support of Turkic dynasty. Ashide leaders initiated the liberation revolt of the Turkuts (679-682) against Tang dynasty.

Genetics (Data of Y-DNA) 
In 2015-2016 yy. in Fudan University (Shanghai), headed by ethnogenomist Shao-Qing Wen (文少卿) in China, ran tests to determine the Y-DNA haplogroup the representatives from aristocratic Turkic clan Ashide.

They found a subclade of the Ashide clan had the haplogroup Q1a-L53.

References

Bibliography
 Азат Абдысадыр уулу: Первые из тюрков. Тюркютские роды "Ашина" и "Ашидэ"
 Кляшторный.Г. Древнетюркская надпись на каменном изваянии из Чойрэна//СНВ. Вып. XXII. М.: 1980. С. 90-102.

Ashide